Gesell may refer to:

 Villa Gesell Partido, Argentina
 Villa Gesell, a capital city of Villa Gesell Partido
 Asociación Deportiva Atlético Villa Gesell, a soccer team founded there
 Gesell Institute, a non-profit organization named after Arnold Gesell

People with the surname
 Arnold Gesell (1880≠1961), American psychologist and pediatrician
 Claudia Gesell (born 1977), German middle-distance runner
 Gerhard Gesell (1910–1993), United States federal judge
 Silvio Gesell (1862–1930), German merchant and economist

German-language surnames
Surnames from nicknames